Wendell Jerome Green Jr. (born August 7, 2002) is an American college basketball player for the Auburn Tigers of the Southeastern Conference (SEC). He previously played for the Eastern Kentucky Colonels.

High school career
Green played basketball for Detroit Country Day School in Beverly Hills, Michigan. As a sophomore, he averaged 19.5 points, eight assists and seven rebounds per game. For his junior season, Green transferred to La Lumiere School in La Porte, Indiana. At La Lumiere, he played alongside teammates Isaiah Stewart, Keion Brooks Jr., Jaden Ivey, Jeremy Sochan, and Kamari Lands. As a junior, he helped his team reach the title game at GEICO Nationals. Green committed to playing college basketball for Eastern Kentucky over offers from DePaul, Rhode Island and TCU.

College career
On January 2, 2021, Green posted a freshman season-high 30 points and five rebounds for Eastern Kentucky in an 80–75 win against Austin Peay. As a freshman, he averaged 15.8 points, five assists, 3.4 rebounds and 1.6 steals per game, earning First Team All-Ohio Valley Conference (OVC) and All-Newcomer Team honors. He was a five-time OVC Freshman of the Week selection.

For his sophomore season, Green transferred to Auburn.

Career statistics

College

|-
| style="text-align:left;"| 2020–21
| style="text-align:left;"| Eastern Kentucky
| 29 || 25 || 30.5 || .396 || .364 || .769 || 3.4 || 5.0 || 1.6 || .1 || 15.8
|-
| style="text-align:left;"| 2021-22
| style="text-align:left;"| Auburn
| 34 || 5 || 26.4 || .365 || .317 || .844 || 3.7 || 5.1 || 1.5 || 0 || 12.0

Personal life
Green is the son of Wendell Green Sr. and Rhonda Dalton-Green. Green is a Christian.

References

External links
Auburn Tigers bio
Eastern Kentucky Colonels bio

2002 births
Living people
American men's basketball players
Basketball players from Detroit
Point guards
Auburn Tigers men's basketball players
Eastern Kentucky Colonels men's basketball players
La Lumiere School alumni
Detroit Country Day School alumni